The Atlanta Braves are a professional baseball team based in Atlanta, Georgia. The Braves are members of the National League (NL) East division in Major League Baseball (MLB). Since the franchise started as the Boston Red Stockings (no relationship to the current Boston Red Sox team) in 1871, the team has changed its name several times and relocated twice. The Braves were a charter member of the NL in 1876 as the Boston Red Caps, and are one of the NL's two remaining charter franchises (the other being the Chicago Cubs). In baseball, the head coach of a team is called the manager, or more formally, the field manager. The duties of the team manager include team strategy and leadership on and off the field. The Braves franchise has employed 45 managers.

The franchise's first manager was Hall of Famer Harry Wright, who managed the team for eleven seasons. Frank Selee was the next manager to have managed the team for eleven seasons, with a total of twelve with the formerly named Boston Beaneaters. The formerly named Boston Braves made their first postseason appearance under George Stallings in 1914, winning the World Series that year. Several other managers spent long tenures with the Braves. Bill McKechnie managed the Braves from 1930 to 1937, while Casey Stengel managed the team from 1938 to 1942. The franchise was known as the Boston Bees from 1936 to 1940, and was again named the Boston Braves until 1952. Stengel also managed the Braves in 1943.

From 1943 to 1989, no managerial term lasted as long as five complete seasons. The Braves were managed by Billy Southworth from 1946 to 1949, and again from 1950 to 1951. Southworth led the team into the 1948 World Series, which ended the Braves' 34-year postseason drought; the World Series ended in a losing result for the Braves. In 1953, the team moved from Boston to Milwaukee, where it was known as the Milwaukee Braves. Its first manager in Milwaukee was Charlie Grimm, who managed the team from mid-season of 1952 to mid-season of 1956. Fred Haney took over the managerial position after Grimm, and led the team to the World Series in 1957, defeating the New York Yankees in a game seven to win the series.

In 1966, the team moved from Milwaukee to its current location, Atlanta. Its first manager in Atlanta was Bobby Bragan, who managed the team for three seasons earlier in Milwaukee. Lum Harris was the first manager to have managed the team in Atlanta for more than four seasons. Harris led the team into the NL Championship Series (NLCS) in 1969, but failed to advance into the World Series. Joe Torre was the next manager to manage the Braves into the postseason, but like Harris, led the team into the NLCS with a losing result. Bobby Cox was the manager of the Braves from 1990 till 2010. Under his leadership the Braves made the postseason 15 times, winning five National League championships and one World Series title in 1995. Cox has the most regular season wins, regular season losses, postseason appearances, postseason wins and postseason losses of any Braves manager. He was named NL Manager of the Year three times, in 1991, 2004 and 2005.

After Cox retired upon the conclusion of the 2010 season, Fredi González was hired to take over as manager.

Several managers have had multiple tenures with the Braves. John Morrill served three terms in the 1880s as the Braves manager, while Fred Tenney, Stengel, Bob Coleman, Southworth, Dave Bristol and Cox each served two terms. Ted Turner and Vern Benson's term each lasted only a single game, as they were both interim managers between Bristol's tenures.

Table key

Managers

See also 
Atlanta Braves all-time roster
List of Atlanta Braves seasons

Notes 
#: A running total of the number of Braves' managers. Thus, any manager who has two or more separate terms is only counted once.

References 
General

Specific

 
Lists of Major League Baseball managers
Managers